H.E.A.T II is the sixth studio album by the Swedish hard rock group H.E.A.T and final album with lead singer Erik Grönwall.  The album was released on 21 February 2020 through earMUSIC. As the album came out at the onset of the COVID-19 pandemic, H.E.A.T did not extensively tour for it that year. The band announced they were postponing their tour dates until 2021. In October 2020 it was announced that Erik Grönwall would be leaving the band; being replaced by original lead singer Kenny Leckremo. When the tour resumed H.E.A.T stated that all tour dates from that point onward would feature Kenny as their vocalist. Singles from the album include "One by One", released on 27 September 2019 and "Rise", released on 8 November 2019. On 29 June, 2020 the band released a previously unheard song called "Back to Life" that was recorded during the H.E.A.T II sessions.

Track listing

Personnel
 Erik Grönwall – lead vocals
 Dave Dalone – guitar
 Jona Tee – keyboards
 Jimmy Jay – bass
 Don Crash – drums

Charts

References

2020 albums
H.E.A.T albums